KBFK-LP, virtual channel 34 (UHF digital channel 36), is a low-powered Movies!-affiliated television station licensed to Bakersfield, California, United States. The station is owned by Cocola Broadcasting. MeTV was seen on 36.1, but was dropped in August 2014. Movies! was added to 36.2 on February 1, 2014. As of 2019, Cocola combined KBFK and KCBT's virtual channels in Bakersfield. Both channels are now located on channel 34.

Subchannels
The station's digital signal is multiplexed:

References

External links

www.cocolatv.com

Movies! affiliates
BFK-LP
Television channels and stations established in 1990
Low-power television stations in the United States
1990 establishments in California